Petr Štrach (born June 20, 1983) is a Czech former professional ice hockey defenceman.

Štrach played three games in the Czech Extraliga for HC Slavia Praha during the 2003–04 season. He also played in the Slovak Extraliga for MHC Martin and in the Polska Liga Hokejowa during the 2010–11 season.

References

External links

1983 births
Living people
HC Baník Sokolov players
HC Benátky nad Jizerou players
HC Berounští Medvědi players
Czech ice hockey defencemen
HC Dukla Jihlava players
HC Kometa Brno players
KTH Krynica players
MHC Martin players
BK Mladá Boleslav players
Orli Znojmo players
IHC Písek players
Sportovní Klub Kadaň players
HC Slavia Praha players
Sportspeople from Kladno
HC Vrchlabí players
Czech expatriate ice hockey players in Slovakia
Czech expatriate sportspeople in Poland
Expatriate ice hockey players in Poland